Physiological Reviews is a journal published quarterly by the American Physiological Society which has been published since 1921.  The editor in chief of the journal is Sadis Matalon (University of Alabama at Birmingham).  The journal's first managing editor, who served to his death in 1946, was Dr. Donald R. Hooker.  Among the cadre of editors at the journal's inception were William Henry Howell, Lafayette Mendel, and John Macleod.  From 1932 to 1950, the chairman of the board of editors of the journal was Anton J. Carlson.  Other notable people who have served on the journal's editorial board include John Jacob Abel (c.1935), Ernest William Goodpasture (c.1938).

According to the Journal Citation Reports, the journal has a 2020 impact factor of 37.312

Internet Archive page set (values in table linked to specific pages)

References

Further reading 

 ResearchGate journal ranking: 
SCImago Journal Rank: 
 About Physiological Reviews (access date: July 13, 2020)

External links

Physiology journals
Quarterly journals
English-language journals
Publications established in 1921
Delayed open access journals